Eric Dru Hanhold (born November 1, 1993) is an American professional baseball pitcher in the San Diego Padres organization. He has played in Major League Baseball (MLB) for the New York Mets and Baltimore Orioles.

Amateur career
Hanhold attended East Lake High School in Tarpon Springs, Florida. He committed to play college baseball at the University of Florida before his senior season. As a senior, he was 7–3 with a 1.14 ERA. He was drafted by the Philadelphia Phillies in the 40th round of the 2012 Major League Baseball draft, but did not sign and instead enrolled at the University of Florida, where he majored in criminology. In 2014, he played collegiate summer baseball with the Orleans Firebirds of the Cape Cod Baseball League.

Professional career

Milwaukee Brewers
As a junior at Florida, Hanhold was 1–0 with a 4.26 ERA in innings pitched, making four starts and ten relief appearances. After his junior year, he was drafted by the Milwaukee Brewers in the sixth round of the 2015 Major League Baseball draft, and he signed for $250,000.

After signing, Hanhold made his professional debut with the Arizona League Brewers, and after one game, he was promoted to the Wisconsin Timber Rattlers where he finished the season with an 0–4 record and a 7.60 ERA in ten games (seven starts). In 2016, he played for the Brevard County Manatees where he was 2–12 with a 4.81 ERA in 19 starts, and in 2017, he pitched with the Carolina Mudcats, posting an 8–3 record and a 3.94 ERA in 64 innings pitched, mainly in relief.

New York Mets
On September 12, 2017, Hanhold was traded to the New York Mets as the player to be named later in the Neil Walker trade that took place in August. He began 2018 with the Binghamton Rumble Ponies and after posting a 3–1 record and a 2.84 ERA in 17 relief appearances he was promoted to the Las Vegas 51s.

Hanhold was promoted to the Major Leagues on September 1, 2018. He made his Major League debut on September 4 at Dodger Stadium against the Los Angeles Dodgers, pitching  innings scoreless innings of relief, allowing one hit, one walk, and a hit by pitch, as well as recording one strikeout.

Baltimore Orioles
On September 16, 2019, Hanhold was claimed off waivers by the Baltimore Orioles. Hanhold was designated for assignment on January 7, 2020, and outrighted on January 13. On September 12, 2021, the Orioles selected his contract from the Triple-A Norfolk Tides. Hanhold made 10 appearances for the Orioles, posting a 6.97 ERA with 6 strikeouts.

Pittsburgh Pirates
On November 3, Hanhold was claimed off of waivers by the Pittsburgh Pirates. On March 18, 2022, Hanhold was designated for assignment by the Pirates. On March 21, Hanhold cleared waivers and was sent outright to the Triple-A Indianapolis Indians.

He elected free agency on November 10, 2022.

San Diego Padres
On December 21, 2022, Hanhold signed a minor league deal with the San Diego Padres.

References

External links

1993 births
Living people
People from Bartlett, Tennessee
Baseball players from Tennessee
Major League Baseball pitchers
New York Mets players
Baltimore Orioles players
Florida Gators baseball players
Orleans Firebirds players
Arizona League Brewers players
Wisconsin Timber Rattlers players
Brevard County Manatees players
Carolina Mudcats players
Gulf Coast Mets players
Brooklyn Cyclones players
Binghamton Rumble Ponies players
Las Vegas 51s players
Syracuse Mets players
Norfolk Tides players
Indianapolis Indians players
Lakeshore Chinooks players